Charles Coote (1713-1796) was an 18th-century Anglican priest in Ireland.

Coote was educated at Trinity College, Dublin.  He was the son of Reverend Chidley Coote and Jane Evans, and the brother of Eyre Coote (East India Company officer).  He was Precentor of Christ Church Cathedral, Dublin from 1772; and Dean of Kilfenora  from 1781, where he succeeded his uncle (also called Charles Coote): he held both posts until his death in 1796.

References

Deans of Kilfenora
18th-century Irish Anglican priests
Alumni of Trinity College Dublin
1796 deaths
1713 births